John Nicholas Wurm (December 6, 1927 – April 27, 1984) was an American prelate of the Roman Catholic Church.  He served as the fifth bishop of the Diocese of Belleville in  Illinois from 1981 to 1984.  He previously serve as an auxiliary bishop of the Archdiocese of St. Louis in Missouri from 1976 to 1981.

Biography
John Wurm was born the seventh of fourteen children of Anthony and Rose Wurm on December 6, 1927, in St. Louis, Missouri.  He was baptized on December 18, 1927, at All Souls Church in Overland, Missouri. Wurm attended All Souls Catholic School, the Cathedral Latin School, and Kenrick-Glennon Seminary in St. Louis.  

Wurm was ordained a priest for the Archdiocese of St. Louis on April 3, 1954, by Cardinal Joseph Ritter.

Wurm was appointed titular bishop of alestia and as an auxiliary bishop of St. Louis on June 25, 1976 by Pope Paul VI.  Wurm was consecrated bishop on August 17, 1976, by Cardinal John Carberry. 

On September 19, 1981, Wurm was appointed as the fifth bishop of the Diocese of Belleville by Pope John Paul II.  Wurm was installed on November 4, 1981.

Bishop Wurm died on April 27, 1984, in Belleville of cancer.

References

External links
A biography of Bp. Wurm from Knights of Columbus Council #1376, in Bp. Wurm's hometown
Listing of former bishops of the Diocese of Belleville, from the Diocese's official site

1927 births
1984 deaths
People from Belleville, Illinois
Clergy from St. Louis
Kenrick–Glennon Seminary alumni
Roman Catholic Archdiocese of St. Louis
20th-century Roman Catholic bishops in the United States
Roman Catholic bishops of Belleville
Religious leaders from Missouri